The Recorder of London is an ancient legal office in the City of London. The Recorder of London is the senior circuit judge at the Central Criminal Court (the Old Bailey), hearing trials of criminal offences. The Recorder is appointed by the Crown on the recommendation of the City of London Corporation with the concurrence of the Lord Chancellor. The Recorder's deputy is the Common Serjeant of London, appointed by the Crown on the recommendation of the Lord Chancellor. The Recorder of London is, since 14 April 2020, Mark Lucraft.

Background

The first Recorder of London was appointed in 1298. Originally it seems likely that the Recorder would have recorded pleas in the court of the Lord Mayor and the aldermen and delivered their judgments.  A charter granted by Henry VI in 1444 appointed the Recorder ex officio a conservator of the peace. The Recorder increasingly exercised judicial functions thereafter, eventually becoming the principal judge in the City of London.

The Recorder became a judge at the Central Criminal Court when it was created by Parliament in 1834.  The Central Criminal Court became part of the Crown Court under the Courts Act 1971, but the Recorder maintained their position when the office of recorder in other cities became honorary.

Functions
In addition to hearing criminal trials at the Central Criminal Court, the Recorder of London heads up court list management (including allocation of cases) to the court's judges.  The Recorder also provides legal advice to the Lord Mayor and the Court of Aldermen.

The Recorder has a traditional costume and takes charge of the election of the Lord Mayor of London, declares the result, and physically presents the new Lord Mayor for the monarch's approval, first to the Lord Chancellor, and then to the Lord Chief Justice and the Master of the Rolls (at the Royal Courts of Justice on the day of the Lord Mayor's Show). On the occasion of a state visit, the Recorder usually presents an Address of Welcome on behalf of the City.
 
The Recorder of London is the returning officer at the election of the verderers of Epping Forest, and is usually appointed High Steward of Southwark, appointed by the Court of Aldermen, holding the sitting of the three courts leet of the City's (largely ceremonial) manors there each year.

The Recorder can act as the deputy of the Common Serjeant in the election of the Sheriff and their presentation to the King's Remembrancer at the Quit Rent ceremony.

List of Recorders of London
(before 1495 may not be complete)

 1298 – (or John) Geoffrey de Norton
 1303 – John de Wengrave (later Lord Mayor)
 1321 – Jeffrey de Hertpoll (or Hertpole)
 1321 – Robert de Swalchyne (or Robert de Swalclyve)
 1329 – Gregory de Norton
 1339 – Roger de Depham
 1353 – Thomas Ludlow (later Chief Baron)
 1365 – William de Halden
 1377 – William Cheyne (perhaps later Chief Justice of the King's Bench)
 1389 – John Tremayne
 1392 – William Makenade
 1394 – John Cokayne
 1398 – Matthew de Sulhworth
 1403 – Thomas Thornburgh
 1405 – John Preston
 1415 – John Barton
 1422 – John Fray (later Chief Baron)
 1426 – John Simonds
 1435 – Alexander Anne
 1440 – Thomas Cockayn
 1440 – William (alias John) Bowes (also Speaker)
 1442 – Robert Danvers
 1451 – Thomas Billing (later Chief Justice of the King's Bench)
 1455 – Thomas Urswick (later Chief Baron)
 1471 – Sir Humphrey Starkey (later Chief Baron)
 1483 – Thomas Fitzwilliam (later Speaker of the House of Commons)
 1495–1508 – Sir Robert Sheffield
 1508–18 – John Chalyner
 1518–20 – Richard Broke (later also Justice of Common Pleas and Chief Baron)
 1520–26 – William Shelley (later Justice of Common Pleas)
 1526–36 – John Baker
 1536–46 – Sir Roger Cholmeley (later Chief Justice of the King's Bench)
 1546–53 – Robert Broke (later Justice of the Common Pleas, also Speaker)
 1553–63 – Ralph Cholmley (later Chief Justice of the Common Pleas)
 1563–66 – Richard Onslow
 1566–69 – Sir Thomas Bromley (later Lord Chancellor)
 1569–71 – Thomas Wilbraham (later a judge of the Court of Wards and Liveries)
 1571–91 – William Fleetwood
 1591–92 – Edward Coke (later Chief Justice of the Common Pleas and then Chief Justice of the King's Bench)
 1592–94 – Edward Drew
 1594–95 – Thomas Fleming
 1595–1603 – John Croke (also Speaker of the House of Commons in 1601)
 1603–16 – Henry Montagu (later Chief Justice of the King's Bench)
 1616 – Thomas Coventry
 1616–18 – Sir Anthony Benn
 1618 – Richard Martin
 1618–20 – Robert Heath
 1620 – Robert Shute

 1620–31 – Sir Heneage Finch (also Speaker of the House of Commons)
 1631–34 – Edward Littleton
 1634–35 – Robert Mason
 1635 – Sir Henry Calthorpe
 1635–43 – Thomas Gardiner
 1643 – Peter Phesant
 1643–49 – Sir John Glynn (previously Recorder of Westminster)
 1649–55 – William Steele (later Chief Baron of the Exchequer and then Lord Chancellor of Ireland)
 1655–58 – Lislebone Long
 1658–59 – John Green
 1659–68 – William Wilde (later Justice of the Common Pleas and then Justice of the King's Bench)
 1668–76 – John Howell
 1676–78 – Sir William Dolben (later Justice of the King's Bench)
 1678–80 – Sir George Jeffreys (later Chief Justice of the King's Bench)
 1680–83 – George Treby (displaced after the City of London's charters were suspended in 1683 under the Quo Warranto proceedings; restored in 1692, but then Chief Justice of the Common Pleas)
 1683–85 – Sir Thomas Jenner (later Baron of the Exchequer)
 1685–87 – Sir John Holt (later Lord Chief Justice)
 1687–88 – Sir John Tate
 1688–92 – Bartholomew Shower
 1692–1708 – Salathiel Lovell (later Justice of the Common Pleas and Baron of the Exchequer)
 1708–14 – Sir Peter King (later Chief Justice of Common Pleas)
 1714–39 – Sir William Thompson (later Baron of the Exchequer)
 1739–42 – Sir John Strange
 1742–43 – Simon Urlin
 1743–49 – John Stracey
 1749–53 – Sir Richard Adams (later Baron of the Exchequer)
 1753–63 – Sir William Moreton
 1763–72 – Sir James Eyre (later Chief Baron of the Exchequer, and Chief Justice of the Common Pleas)
 1772–79 – John Glynn
 1779–89 – James Adair
 1789–1803 – Sir John William Rose
 1803–22 – Sir John Silvester, Bt
 1822–33 – Newman Knowlys
 1833–50 – Charles Ewan Law
 1850–56 – James Stuart-Wortley, MP
 1856–78 – Russell Gurney
 1878–91 – Thomas Chambers
 1892–1900 – Charles Hall
 1900–22 – Sir Forrest Fulton
 1922–34 – Sir Ernest Wild
 1934–37 – Henry Holman Gregory
 1937–59 – Sir Gerald Dodson
 1959–64 – Edward Anthony Hawke
 1964–75 – Carl Aarvold
 1975–90 – Sir James Miskin
 1990–98 – Sir Lawrence Verney
 1998–2004 – Michael Hyam
 2004–13 – Peter Beaumont
 2013–15 - Brian Barker
 2015-19 - Nicholas Hilliard
 2020-     Mark Lucraft

References

  Senior Circuit Judge Appointment – The Recorder of London , Judicial Appointments Commission
 Next Recorder of London announced: His Honour Judge Brian Barker QC, City of London, 10 December 2012
 The history and antiquities of London, Westminster, Southwark, and other parts adjacent, Volume 2, Thomas Allen, 1839, p. 282–284 
 The Bar and the Old Bailey, 1750–1850, p. 45, 151
 The Office of Recorder of the City of London, Sir Lawrence Verney, 30 October 2000
 [www.cityoflondon.gov.uk/jobs/Documents/Information%20pack.pdf Job description]

 
Old Bailey
Civic high stewards
Historical legal occupations
Law in London